Lash is the second EP from The Jesus Lizard. It was released in 1993 on Touch and Go Records.

Track listing
 "Glamorous" - 3:07
 "Deaf as a Bat" - 1:40
 "Lady Shoes (Live)" - 2:37
 "Killer McHann (Live)" - 2:11
 "Bloody Mary (Live)" - 2:41
 "Monkey Trick (Live)" - 4:32

References

External links
Touch and Go Records page on the album

1993 EPs
The Jesus Lizard albums
Touch and Go Records EPs